Mys is a rural locality (a village) in Churovskoye Rural Settlement, Sheksninsky District, Vologda Oblast, Russia. The population was 16 as of 2002.

Geography 
Mys is located 12 km east of Sheksna (the district's administrative centre) by road. Mikhaylovskoye is the nearest rural locality.

References 

Rural localities in Sheksninsky District